Tracheitis is an inflammation of the trachea.
Although the trachea is usually considered part of the lower respiratory tract, in ICD-10 tracheitis is classified under "acute upper respiratory infections".

Symptoms
 Increasing deep or barking croup cough following a recent upper respiratory infection
 Crowing sound when inhaling (inspiratory stridor)
 'Scratchy' feeling in the throat
 Chest pain
 Fever
 Ear ache
 Headache
 Dizziness (light headed)
 Labored breathing

Causes

Bacterial tracheitis is a bacterial infection of the trachea and is capable of producing airway obstruction.

One of the most common causes is Staphylococcus aureus and often follows a recent viral upper respiratory infection.  Bacterial tracheitis is a rare complication of influenza infection. It is the most serious in young children, possibly because of the relatively small size of the trachea that gets easily blocked by swelling.  The most frequent sign is the rapid development of stridor.  It is occasionally confused with croup.
If it is inflamed, a condition known as tracheitis can occur. In this condition there can be inflammation of the linings of the trachea. A condition called tracheo-bronchitis can be caused, when the mucous membrane of the trachea and bronchi swell. A collapsed trachea is formed as a result of defect in the cartilage, that makes the cartilage unable to support the trachea and results in dry hacking cough. In this condition there can be inflammation of the linings of the trachea. If the connective nerve tissues in the trachea degenerate it causes tracheomalacia. Infections to the trachea can cause tracheomegaly.

Diagnosis
The diagnosis of tracheitis requires the direct vision of exudates or pseudomembranes on the trachea. X-ray findings may include subglottic narrowing. The priority is to secure the patient's airway, and to rule out croup and epiglottitis which may be fatal. Suspicion for tracheitis should be high in cases of onset of airway obstruction that do not respond to racemic epinephrine.

Treatment 
In more severe cases, it is treated by administering intravenous antibiotics and may require admission to an intensive care unit (ICU) for intubation and supportive ventilation if the airway swelling is severe.  During an intensive care admission, various methods of invasive and non-invasive monitoring may be required, which may include ECG monitoring, oxygen saturation, capnography and arterial blood pressure monitoring.

References

External links

Acute upper respiratory infections
Human head and neck
Chronic lower respiratory diseases